Muslim militia may refer to:

 any Islamic militia in general

Balkans
 Sandžak Muslim militia in Yugoslavia during World War II
 Hadžiefendić Legion during World War II
 Militia of Husein Miljković during World War II

Indonesia
 Darul Islam (Indonesia)

Middle East
 Shi'ite Amal militia in the War of the Camps
 Lebanese Civil War (section Political groups and militias)
 South Lebanon conflict (1985–2000)

South Asia
 Razakars militia of Kasim Razvi in the princely state of Hyderabad
 Militia of Ismatullah Muslim in Afghanistan
 The mujahideen in Afghanistan during the Soviet-Afghan war

Africa
 Pro-French Harki militia in the Military history of Algeria
 Militias in the Central African Republic conflict (2012–present)

Caucasus
 Militias in the Armenian–Azerbaijani War